This is a list of members of the third Gauteng Provincial Legislature as elected in the election of 14 April 2004. In that election, the African National Congress (ANC) retained its majority in the legislature, winning 51 of 73 seats. In its first sitting on 26 April 2004, the legislature re-elected Mbhazima Shilowa as Premier of Gauteng. It also elected Richard Mdakane as Speaker and Mary Metcalfe as Deputy Speaker.  

The Democratic Alliance, with 15 seats, was the official opposition in the legislature. Also represented in the legislature were the Inkatha Freedom Party (IFP), the African Christian Democratic Party (ACDP), the Freedom Front Plus (FF+), the Independent Democrats (ID), the Pan Africanist Congress of Azania (PAC), and the United Democratic Movement (UDM). For the first time since the legislature was established in 1994, the New National Party was not represented. 

Metcalfe resigned from the legislature in 2005 and was replaced as Deputy Speaker by Sophia Williams-De Bruyn. Moreover, in 2008, Shilowa resigned as Premier and Paul Mashatile was elected to replace him.

Composition 

|-style="background:#e9e9e9;"
!colspan="2" style="text-align:left"| Party !! style="text-align:center"| Seats 
|-
|  || 51
|-
|  || 15 
|-
|  || 2
|-
|  || 1 
|-
|  || 1 
|-
|  || 1
|-
|  || 1 
|-
|  || 1 
|-
|colspan="2" style="text-align:left"| Total || style="text-align:right"| 73 
|}

Members 

Members of the third legislature included:

 Joachim Boers (ANC)
 Firoz Cachalia (ANC)
 Barbara Creecy (ANC)
 Brian Hlongwa (ANC)
 Ignatius Jacobs (ANC)
 Kgaogelo Lekgoro (ANC)
 Bob Mabaso (ANC)
 Qedani Mahlangu (ANC)
 Lindiwe Maseko (ANC)
 Paul Mashatile (ANC)
 Richard Mdakane (ANC)
 Mary Metcalfe (ANC)
 Jacqueline Mofokeng (ANC)
 Nomvula Mokonyane (ANC)
 Khabisi Mosunkutu (ANC)
 Angie Motshekga (ANC)
 Gwen Ramokgopa (ANC)
 Mbhazima Shilowa (ANC)
 Angie Motshekga (ANC)
 Khabisi Mosunkutu (ANC)
 Nomvula Mokonyane (ANC)
 Amon Msane (ANC)
 Refiloe Ndzuta (ANC)
 Mandla Nkomfe (ANC)
 Michael Seloane (ANC)
 Dikeledi Tsotetsi (ANC)
 Sophia Williams-De Bruyn (ANC)

 Jack Bloom (DA)
 Brian Goodall (DA)
 Hermene Koorts (DA)
 Glenda Steyn (DA)

 Gertrude Mzizi (IFP)
 Sibongile Nkomo (IFP)
 Lydia Meshoe (ACDP)
 Jaco Mulder (FF+)
 Themba Sono (ID)
 Malesela Ledwaba (PAC)
 Nomakhosazana Mncedane (UDM)

References 

Legislature
South Africa